Lefkogeia is a village in the municipal unit of Foinikas, Rethymno regional unit, Crete, Greece. The village has 289 inhabitants.

Populated places in Rethymno (regional unit)